Old Academy refers to the first era of the Platonic Academy.

Old Academy may also refer to:

 Old Academy (Munich), a building also known as the Wilhelminum in Munich, Germany
 Old Academy, Perth, a historic building in Perth, Scotland
 Old Academy Building, a building in Cathedral Square in Turku, Finland